Georgian Workers Communist Party was a political party in Georgia. The chairman of the party was Panteleimon Giorgadze. In 1994 the party merged into the United Communist Party of Georgia.
Communist parties in Georgia (country)
Defunct political parties in Georgia (country)